Sonja Annika Maria Aldén (born 20 December 1977) is a Swedish singer mostly famous for her 2006, 2007, 2012 and 2020 Melodifestivalen entries, and for working together with Shirley Clamp and Sanna Nielsen, as well as her songwriting for other artists. For example, the hard rock/heavy metal band The Poodles, who also participated in the Swedish Melodifestivalen 2006 with the song "Night of Passion". As a student she attended the Adolf Fredrik's Music School in Stockholm.

Sonja Aldén at Melodifestivalen
In the Swedish Melodifestivalen 2006, Sonja Aldén, presented as Sonya participated with "Etymon" but did not qualify for the final. 
In the Melodifestivalen 2007, Sonja Aldén, participated with the ballad "För att du finns", which reached "Andra Chansen" ("Second chance") when it finished 4th in the semifinal in Örnsköldsvik on 17 February 2007. 
She returned to the Melodifestivalen 2012 after five years of absence with her song "I din himmel" (In Your Heaven), but did not qualify for the final.

Break from Melodifestivalen
During the spring of 2017, she toured Sweden with the album "Meningen med livet".

Return to Melodifestivalen
On 26 November 2019, SVT and Eurovision announced that Aldén would be among the 28 competing acts for Melodifestivalen 2020. She performed in the first semifinal with the song "Sluta aldrig gå", failing to qualify and ending in fifth place.

Discography

Albums

Joint albums

Singles

As Sanna, Shirley, Sonja

Notes

References

External links 

Official Website (In Swedish)
Sonja Aldén UK Fan Club

1977 births
Living people
People from St Albans
Swedish-language singers
Swedish pop singers
Schlager musicians
21st-century Swedish singers
21st-century Swedish women singers
Melodifestivalen contestants of 2020
Melodifestivalen contestants of 2012
Melodifestivalen contestants of 2007
Melodifestivalen contestants of 2006